Crossabeg or Crosabeg is a small village in County Wexford, Ireland, just north of Wexford town. It contains The Forge Storytelling House, Foley's Pub, St Patrick, St Brigid and St Killian's  Catholic church with adjoining cemetery and a primary school.

History
Fr James Dixon, the first priest with an official Catholic Church appointment in Australia, ministered in Crossabeg both before and after his time in Australia.

Sport
Established in 1973,  Crossabeg A.F.C. have 2  Senior teams and their facilities are located in Newcastle. The facilities include 2 full size junior playing surfaces, 1 under 10 pitch, a grass training pitch and an all weather surface training pitch.

Facilities
Among tourist attractions in Crossabeg are Ferrycarrig Castle and the four-star Ferrycarrig Hotel located in a setting overlooking the River Slaney.

Crossabeg also contains Ferrycarrig Park, home of the League of Ireland First Division team Wexford FC, and Women's National League team Wexford Youths WFC.

Public transport
Wexford Bus route 877 "The Bridge Loop" provides an hourly service to/from Wexford Mondays to Saturdays inclusive.
Bus Éireann route 380 serves the village on Fridays providing a link to Wexford via Castlebridge.

The nearest railway station is Wexford railway station approximately 9 kilometres distant.

See also
 List of towns and villages in Ireland

References

External links

Towns and villages in County Wexford